Delia Lindsay (born 19 September 1945, Sudan) is an English film, stage and television actress.

Background
Delia Lindsay was married to actor Jeremy Sinden from 1978 until his death in 1996. The couple had two children, Kezia and Harriet.

Filmography
 Scars of Dracula (1970)
 Tam-Lin (1970)
 Because of the Cats (1973)
 The Mystery of Edwin Drood (1993)
 Mrs Brown (1997)
 Hilary and Jackie (1998)
 An Ideal Husband (1999)
 Piccadilly Jim (2005)

References

External links
 

1945 births 
Living people 
20th-century English actresses
English film actresses
English stage actresses
English television actresses
Sinden family